Dark Adrenaline is the sixth studio album by Italian gothic metal band Lacuna Coil.  The album was produced by Don Gilmore (Linkin Park, Bullet For My Valentine), and mixed by Marco Barusso (Cayne, Modà, Laura Pausini, Eros Ramazzotti). 
The album debuted at number fifteen on the Billboard 200 chart with initial sales of 20,000. It also charted in the top five on four other Billboard charts including the Rock Albums, Alternative Albums, Hard Rock Albums and the Independent Albums charts. The album was also successful throughout Europe, charting in ten countries, six of which Lacuna Coil have achieved their highest chart positions in those countries to date. This album has charted in fifteen countries.

The first single from the album, "Trip the Darkness", was released on October 17, 2011 before the album itself was released and is included as a remix on the soundtrack to Underworld: Awakening. "Fire" was released as the second single on June 15, 2012. The official music video was filmed on May 10, 2012.

Reception

Upon its release, the album has received positive reviews from professional music critics who generally praised the mix of both Cristina Scabbia's and Andrea Ferro's vocals together and the return to their more Gothic roots after their previous release, Shallow Life. Allmusic gave the album a 4 out of 5 star rating describing the album as, "Bigger and bolder" than their 2009 release Shallow Life and stating it is the band's, "most explosive work to date". About.com give a similar 4 star review, stating the album as, "darker vibed" and, "bombastic" also going on to say that it is an album that can please newer and long-term fans. Loudwire gave a four out of five star review describing the tracks on the album as, "darker and rebellious", also describing vocals on the album as, "impeccable", despite saying that the album is not "out there". About.com described the cover of R.E.M.'s song, "Losing My Religion" as, "riskier" saying that, "it turned out pretty well".

Track listing

End of Time
End of Time was written by Lacuna Coil in collaboration with producer Don Gilmore, which received positive reviews from Music critics.  Chad Bowar of About.com praised the harmony vocals, saying "[the song] is a very catchy power ballad that features some brief harmony vocals, which is something I wish Lacuna Coil would do more often.

Video
Cristina Scabbia and Andrea Ferro began shooting the music video for "End of Time" on October 17, 2012 in Milan, Italy. It was directed by their regular collaborator Roberto Cinardi with the pseudonym of SaKu, who previously directed Lacuna Coil's music videos for Spellbound (2009), I Won't Tell You (2010) and the short movie Dark Passengers (2012).

Dark Passengers
Dark Passengers is a DVD which was included with the Digipack, Box Set and Darkest Adrenaline Super Deluxe Box Set editions of the album. It contains six short films shot by Roberto Cinardi with the pseudonym of SaKu (who already worked with the band for the videos of Spellbound and I Won't Tell You). The shorts contain the instrumental version of six songs from the standard issue of Dark Adrenaline. Every short has a member of the band as the main character and they represent Cristina's visions of the other members of the band after the Injection of the mysterious drug called "Dark Adrenaline". In the first video, based on "Give Me Something More", we see Cristina imprisoned by her evil twin. The second one, with "Intoxicated", shows Andrea as the protagonist of an adaptation of F. W. Murnau's Nosferatu. The third based on "Upsidedown" with Marco Biazzi as Jason Voorhees. The fourth with "Kill the Light" sees Cristiano Migliore playing the victim of a mad scientist. The fifth based on "Fire" with Marco Coti Zelati as a sushi chef. The last one with "Trip the Darkness" and Cristiano Mozzati as leads playing the role of a crazy akira.

Credits for Dark Passengers are adapted from album liner notes.

Directed by: SaKu
Produced by: Kinesis Film
Executive Producer: Marianna De Liso
Production Coordinator: Serena Tagliaferri
Production Assistant: Giuseppe Mele, Luca Brunetti
Casting Director: Francesco Anastasi
Still Photographer: Alice Camandona

D.O.P: Valentina Belli
Editor: Giulio Tiberti
Make Up Artist: Martina Camandona, Beatrice Contino
Costume Designer/ Set Decorator: Silvia Segoloni
Assistant Director: Alice Camandona
FX: Luca Della Grotta
Sound Designer: Valerio Moscatelli

Chart performance
On January 28, it was announced that the album had achieved number 15 on the Billboard 200 in its debut week, with first week sales of 20,000, therefore becoming Lacuna Coil's highest charting album in the United States with Shallow Life achieving 16 on the Billboard 200 in 2009. The album also charted on four other US charts reaching number 2 on the Alternative Albums chart and the Hard Rock Albums Chart, number 3 on the Independent Albums chart and number 5 on the Rock Albums Chart in the same country. Dark Adrenaline charted at number 48 on the UK Albums Chart despite being removed from this chart in its second week after release. The album also charted at number 4 on the UK Rock Chart and in many other countries across Europe, including some of the band's highest chart positions such as number 34 in Finland on the Finnish Albums Chart. The album became the 45th best selling Hard Rock album of 2012 in the United States.

Year-end charts

Editions
Regular Edition: The regular edition of the album, featuring the 12 tracks above.
Regular Edition (Limited Edition): The regular edition of the album, containing different artwork made by the band.
Regular Edition + LP: The regular album + LP
Digipack Edition: The regular 12 songs + a DVD, guitar pick, and Dark Adrenaline poster, packaged in a digipack.
Boxset Edition: Limited EU box containing the Deluxe CD/DVD edition, housed in a digipak with reverse side print on the cardstock and partial glossy varnish, a 2012/13 Lacuna Coil calendar and a three button set in plastic pouch.
Darkest Adrenaline Super Deluxe Box Set Edition: Limited to 500 copies. Contains a vinyl, digipak, hardcover photo book (40 pages), poster, sticker, guitar pick, autographed lithographs, ink vials, syringe pen packaged in a metal medic box.
iTunes Edition: The regular 12 tracks + the following bonus material: 'Soul Inmate', 'Closer' (live on WCC), 'Heavens A Lie' (live on WCC), 'Within Me' (live on WCC), 'I Won’t Tell You' (live on KXFX), 'Spellbound' (on WBYR Second Visit), 'Trip The Darkness' (video).
Hastings Edition: Limited to 3000 copies.  The regular 12 tracks + the following bonus material on a bonus CD: 'Our Truth' (Taken from Karmacode), Spellbound (Taken from Shallow Life), Heaven's a Lie (Taken from Comalies), When a Dead Man Walks (Taken from Unleashed Memories), Falling Again (Taken from In a Reverie), Reverie (Taken from In a Reverie), Distant Sun (Taken from Unleashed Memories), Self-Deception (Taken from Comalies), In Visible Light (Taken from Karmacode), Swamped (Taken from Comalies).  Also contained a coupon for $5 off any CD from Lacuna Coil's Catalog at Hastings locations.

Personnel
Credits for Dark Adrenaline adapted from Barnes & Noble. and from allmusic

Cristina Scabbia: Vocals
Andrea Ferro: Vocals
Cristiano Migliore: Guitars
Marco Biazzi: Guitars
Marco Coti Zelati: Bass, Keyboards
Cristiano Mozzati: Drums, Percussion
With: Mario Riso on guest percussion

Technical

Don Gilmore – composer, producer
Lacuna Coil – composer
Marco Barusso - Mixing Engineer
Mark Kiczula - Recording Engineer
Marco D'Agostino - Mastering

Adam "Doom" Sewell - Management
Mark "Gus" Guy - Tour Manager
Tim Borror - Booking
Paul Ryan - Booking
Michael Toorock - Legal Advisor

References

Lacuna Coil albums
Century Media Records albums